West Dean is a village, Anglican parish and civil parish in the District of Chichester in West Sussex, England  north  of Chichester on the A286 road  just west of Singleton. The parishes include the hamlets of Binderton and Chilgrove.

The 2001 Census recorded 425 people living in 177 households, of whom 248 were economically active. The village is on the Monarch's Way long-distance footpath.

West Dean is in the Lavant Valley in the South Downs and has a Church of England parish church and one public house, The Selsey Arms. The church and most of the houses are built of flint, in most cases with brick quoins and window dressings.

History

West Dean
The Manor of West Dean was in the ancient hundred of Singleton, but was not mentioned by name in the Domesday Book of 1086. The parish included Chilgrove.

Binderton
The Domesday Book records Binderton (Bertredtone) in the Hundred of Singleton in the lands belonging to Earl Roger. It says:

There is evidence of there having been both a chapel and church at Binderton, but not since the 17th century. Kelly's Directory of 1867 says:

The remains of the former chapel stand opposite Binderton House.

Preston
Preston, now a farm between West Dean and Binderton, was considered significant enough to be included in the Domesday survey, where it was listed as having seven households: three villagers and four smallholders.

Parish church

The Church of England parish church of Saint Andrew is a Saxon building from before the Norman conquest of England. It was badly damaged by a fire in 1934 but then sensitively restored under the direction of Frederick Etchells.

West Dean House

West Dean House is a Georgian "Gothick" country house that now houses West Dean College, a specialist college with a worldwide reputation for the study of conservation, making and visual arts. James Wyatt designed the house and it was built in 1804 for Baron Selsey of the Peachey family. After the death of the last Peachey heir it became the home of William James in 1891 and in 1893 much of the house was remodelled to designs by Ernest George and Harold Peto. His son Edward James, donated it to a charitable trust (the Edward James Foundation) in 1964 and it became a college in 1971. Peto also designed the walled gardens, which with the glasshouses and other gardens around the house are open to the public. There is also a park and arboretum.

Landmarks
Kingley Vale is on the border of the parish and is a Site of Special Scientific Interest and a national nature reserve. It is noted for its yew woodlands. The site is also of archaeological interest including Bronze Age and Roman earthworks, cross dykes, Goosehill Camp on Bow Hill and an ancient field system.

Binderton House is a 17th-century Grade II listed house, formerly the home of Anthony Eden.

References

Sources

External links

Villages in West Sussex